The Neamț or Ozana is a right tributary of the river Moldova in Romania. It discharges into the Moldova near Timișești. It flows through the villages Boboiești, Pipirig, Pâțâligeni, Stânca, Leghin, Lunca, Vânători-Neamț, Dumbrava, Timișești and the town Târgu Neamț.

Tributaries

The following rivers are tributaries to the river Neamț:

Left: Mânzatul Mare, Izvoare, Râul Străjii, Dobreanu, Leghin, Procov, Nemțișor
Right: Paltin, Dolia, Dolița, Pluton-Dolhești, Bran, Domesnic, Săscuța, Secu, Valea Rea, Drahura (or Cacova)

References

External links
 Tourist map, Parcul Vânători-Neamț

Rivers of Romania
Rivers of Neamț County